Psaumis is a genus of crabs in the family Xanthidae, containing the following species:

 Psaumis cavipes (Dana, 1852)
 Psaumis fossulata (Girard, 1859)

References

Xanthoidea